The 2018–19 Sydney FC season was the club's 14th season since its establishment in 2004. The club participated in the A-League for the 14th time and the AFC Champions League for the fifth time.

Players

Squad information

From youth squad

Transfers in

Transfers out

Contract extensions

Technical staff

Squad statistics

Appearances and goals

|-
|colspan="24"|Players no longer at the club

† = Scholarship or NPL/NYL-listed player

Preseason and friendlies

Competitions

Overall

A-League

League table

Results summary

Results by round

Matches

Finals series

FFA Cup

AFC Champions League

Group stage

International selections
The following players were selected for the Socceroos:
 Rhyan Grant (Korea/Lebanon friendlies, 2019 AFC Asian Cup, Korea friendly)
 Brandon O'Neill (Korea friendly)
 Andrew Redmayne (Korea friendly)
 Joshua Brillante (Korea friendly)

End-of-season awards
On 1 June 2019, Sydney FC hosted their annual Sky Blue Ball and presented ten awards on the night.

References

External links
 Official Website

2018–19 A-League season by team
Sydney FC seasons